Benguigui is a surname commonly associated with people of North African Jewish descent. Notable people with the surname include:

Jean Benguigui (born 1944), French actor
Valérie Benguigui (1965–2013), French actress
Yamina Benguigui (born 1955), French film director and politician (she is Muslim and carries her Jewish husband's surname)
Patrick Bruel, born Patrick Benguigui
Flore Benguigui, French vocalist and member of the band L'Impératrice

References

Maghrebi Jewish surnames
Arabic-language surnames
Surnames of Algerian origin